The Peak Hill Express was a weekly English language newspaper published in Peak Hill, New South Wales, Australia.

History
The newspaper began publication on 18 July 1902 and ceased publication on 29 June 1956.  Publishers of the newspaper included  A. Miles, Robert James Baker, John McIntyre, Rural Newspapers Ltd. and McLong Peak Hill Printing Co. Ltd.

Digitisation
The paper has been digitised as part of the Australian Newspapers Digitisation Program  project of the National Library of Australia.

See also
List of newspapers in Australia
List of newspapers in New South Wales

References

External links
 

Defunct newspapers published in Sydney